Tetrapleura is a genus of picture-winged flies in the family Ulidiidae.

Species
 Tetrapleura limbatofasciata
 Tetrapleura picta

References

Ulidiidae